Ascending to Infinity is the first studio album by Italian symphonic power metal band Luca Turilli's Rhapsody, created by Luca Turilli after his departure from Rhapsody of Fire. It was released on June 22, 2012 via Nuclear Blast.

Considered by the band member as their own "Rhapsody's 11th album", it is the only album to feature Alex Holzwarth on drums, as he subsequently decided to focus on his duties in Rhapsody of Fire.

Track listing

Personnel 
Band members
Alessandro Conti - lead vocals
Luca Turilli - guitar, keyboards, orchestral arrangements, producer, engineer, cover concept
Dominique Leurquin - guitar
Patrice Guers - bass
Alex Holzwarth - drums

Additional musicians
Bridget Fogle, Previn Moore, Matthias Stockinger, Dan Lucas, Johnny Krüger - choir
Sassy Bernert - female voice on tracks 5, 7 and 9
Jasen Anthony, Previn Moore, Bridget Fogle - narrators

Production
Sebastian 'Basi' Roeder - engineer, mixing
Arnaud Ménard - engineer
Christoph Stickel - mastering

Chart performance

References

Luca Turilli albums
2012 albums
Nuclear Blast albums